
Year 486 BC was a year of the pre-Julian Roman calendar. At the time, it was known as the Year of the Consulship of Viscellinus and Rutilus (or, less frequently, year 268 Ab urbe condita). The denomination 486 BC for this year has been used since the early medieval period, when the Anno Domini calendar era became the prevalent method in Europe for naming years.

Events 
 By place 
 Persian Empire 
 Egypt revolts against Persian rule upon the death of king Darius I. The revolts, probably led by Libyans of the western Delta, are crushed the next year by Xerxes, who reduces Egypt to the status of a conquered province.

 Roman Republic 
 Rome enters into a new treaty with the Hernici.
 During his third consulate, the Roman consul Spurius Cassius Vecellinus proposes an agrarian law to assist needy plebeians.  The proposal is vehemently opposed by the patricians including the other consul Proculus Verginius Tricostus Rutilus, and the plebs turn against the patricians. In the following year Cassius is condemned and executed for high treason.

 China 
 The first part of the Grand Canal of China is built during the reign of King Fuchai of Wu. It links the Yangtze River with the Huai River, and is a measure to ship ample amount of supplies north for intended wars with the northern states of Song and Lu.

 By topic 
 Art 
 The construction of a relief in the Apadana, a ceremonial complex at Persepolis, is finished. It shows Darius and Xerxes receiving tribute and is now kept in the Iranbustan Museum in Tehran.

Births

Deaths 
 Darius I, king of the Persian Achaemenid Empire (b. 550 BCE)
 Spurius Cassius Vecellinus, Roman consul (executed)

References